Saint-Loup-Lamairé is a commune in the Deux-Sèvres department in western France.

The commune was formed in 1974 by the merger of two former communes: Saint-Loup-sur-Thouet and Lamairé.

As indicated by its name, the village of Saint-Loup-sur-Thouet is situated on the River Thouet. The long-distance walking route GR 36 also passes through, en route from Ouistreham, on the coast of the English Channel, to Bourg-Madame, on the border with Spain.

See also
 Théophane Vénard, born in Saint-Loup-sur-Thouet
 Communes of the Deux-Sèvres department

References

Communes of Deux-Sèvres